Francisco Cerúndolo (born 13 August 1998) is an Argentine professional tennis player. He has won one ATP singles title.

Cerúndolo attained a career-high ATP singles ranking of World No. 24 on 25 July 2022 and is the current Argentinian No. 1. He also has a career-high doubles ranking of World No. 203, achieved on 31 October 2022.

Career

2019-2020: ATP debut
Cerúndolo made his ATP main draw debut on home soil at the 2019 Argentina Open in Buenos Aires after receiving a wildcard for the singles main draw, losing to Guido Pella in three sets.

Cerúndolo played another ATP main draw a year later at the 2020 Argentina Open in Buenos Aires after receiving a wildcard for the singles main draw again, losing to Laslo Djere in the first round.

2021: First ATP final, Grand Slam and Olympics debut
In January 2021, he was one of two players to test positive for COVID-19 during the Australian Open qualifying event in Doha.

Francisco Cerúndolo reached his first ATP tour final at the 2021 Argentina Open as a qualifier but was defeated by world No. 9 Diego Schwartzman. He was the first qualifier to reach the final in Buenos Aires since José Acasuso in 2001. At the time, Acasuso was coached by Cerúndolo’s father, Alejandro Cerúndolo.

Cerúndolo made his main draw debut in a Grand Slam at the 2021 French Open as a lucky loser, where he lost to Thiago Monteiro.

Cerúndolo qualified to represent Argentina at the 2020 Summer Olympics.

2022: Two ATP 500 & one Masters semifinals, Two top-10 wins, Maiden title, top 25
At the 2022 Argentina Open, he reached the quarterfinals of his home tournament as a qualifier defeating Miomir Kecmanovic. As a result, he reached the top 100 in the singles rankings, joining Juan Manuel Cerúndolo as the first brothers in the Top 100 at the same time since Alexander Zverev and Mischa Zverev in May 2019.

Cerúndolo received a Special Exempt into the tournament in Rio the following week. There, he beat Benoît Paire, Roberto Carballés Baena and again Kecmanović to reach his first ATP 500 semifinal, where he lost in straight sets to Diego Schwartzman.

Cerúndolo recorded his first ATP Tour victories on a hard court at the Masters 1000 event in Miami, defeating Tallon Griekspoor and seeded players Reilly Opelka and Gael Monfils en route to the fourth round. He beat Frances Tiafoe (who defeated his brother Juan Manuel in the third round) in the fourth round to advance to the quarterfinals. He advanced to the semifinals after Jannik Sinner retired during their match due to foot blisters. Ranked World No. 103 at the time, he became the lowest-ranked semifinalist in the history of the Miami Open, and also became the first male player since Jerzy Janowicz in 2012 to reach the semifinals on their Masters 1000 level debut. He lost to 6th seed Casper Ruud in the semifinals in straight sets. Following this result, his ranking rose 52 places to a career-high of World No. 51.

In Båstad, Cerúndolo recorded his first win against a player inside the Top-10 after beating top seed and defending champion Casper Ruud in 3 sets. He proceeded to reach the final after beating Aslan Karatsev and Pablo Carreño Busta. He defeated Sebastián Báez in the final to win his first ATP title. As a result, he reached the top 30 on 18 July 2022 and the top 25 a week later.

At the 2022 Hamburg European Open, he reached the quarterfinals defeating World No. 8 and second seed Andrey Rublev, his second Top-10 win. He reached his second ATP 500 semifinal by beating Aslan Karatsev in three sets.

2023: First Grand Slam win, Argentine No. 1
Cerúndolo won his first match at a Grand Slam at the Australian Open after beating Guido Pella in the first round.

In In Córdoba, Argentina he defeated fellow Argentine Federico Delbonis to reach the quarterfinals but lost to eventual runner-up compatriot Federico Coria. As a result he became Argentine No. 1 on 13 February 2023.
In Buenos Aires, Argentina he defeated Yannick Hanfmann and Jaume Munar to reach back to back quarterfinals but lost to Bernabe Zapata Miralles.
At the 2023 Rio Open he reached the round of 16 but lost again to Zapata Miralles.

Personal life
His younger brother Juan Manuel Cerúndolo (born 2001) is also a tennis player. Juan Manuel was also in his first final and won his first title at the 2021 Córdoba Open one week before his brother's final. 
The Cerúndolos became the first brothers to reach consecutive finals on the ATP Tour since 2017, when Alexander Zverev won the title in Rome and Mischa Zverev reached the final in Geneva. In Cordoba, Francisco contested the first ATP Tour event in which his brother was also competing, making them the first Argentine brothers in 40 years to appear in the same tournament.

ATP career finals

Singles: 2 (1 title, 1 runner-up)

ATP Challenger and ITF Futures finals

Singles: 16 (13–3)

Doubles: 3 (1–2)

Performance timelines

Singles
Current through the 2022 Rolex Paris Masters.

Record against top 10 players
Cerúndolo's record against players who have been ranked in the top 10, with those who are active in boldface. Only ATP Tour main draw matches are considered:

Wins over top 10 players

References

External links
 
 

1998 births
Living people
Argentine male tennis players
Tennis players from Buenos Aires
South Carolina Gamecocks men's tennis players
South American Games medalists in tennis
South American Games silver medalists for Argentina
Tennis players at the 2019 Pan American Games
Pan American Games competitors for Argentina
Olympic tennis players of Argentina
Tennis players at the 2020 Summer Olympics